The World Poker Tour (WPT) has operated a series of international poker tournaments since 2002 with winners of WPT Main Tour stops awarded a membership to the WPT Champions Club. The WPT Champions Cup is the trophy awarded to all winners of WPT Main Tour stops, and champions have their names engraved on the WPT Champions Cup.

On July 21, 2020, the WPT Champions Cup was renamed to the Mike Sexton WPT Champions Cup in honor of WPT commentator and WPT Champions Club member Mike Sexton. Sexton would unfortunately pass away on September 6, 2020, after battling prostate cancer.

World Poker Tour champions

Season 1 (I) 
The inaugural season of the WPT featured 13 events running from May 2002 to April 2003.

 Costa Rica Classic was a $500 buy-in with $500 rebuys.
Party Poker Million II was held a Limit Hold'em tournament.
 Party Poker Million II was held on Holland America's MS Zaandam cruise ship sailing from Port Canaveral, Florida, to the Virgin Islands.
 Gus Hansen became the first player to win two WPT titles.
Howard Lederer won WPT Player of the Year for Season 1 (I).

Season 2 (II) 
The second season of the WPT featured 14 events running from July 2003 to April 2004.

 PokerStars Caribbean Poker Adventure was held on Royal Caribbean Voyager of the Seas cruise ship.
 PartyPoker Million III was held as a Limit Hold'em tournament.
 PartyPoker Million III was held on a Card Player Cruise on the Sea of Cortez.
 Gus Hansen became the first player to win three WPT titles.
Erick Lindgren won WPT Player of the Year for Season 2 (II).

Season 3 (III) 
The third season of the WPT featured 16 events running from July 2004 to April 2005.

 PartyPoker Million IV was held as a Limit Hold'em tournament.
 PartyPoker Million IV was held on Holland America's MS Oosterdam cruise ship on the Sea of Cortez.
 Daniel Negreanu and Tuan Le became the third and fourth players respectively to win two WPT titles in the same season after Gus Hansen and Howard Lederer each won two in Season 1 (I).
Doyle Brunson became the first player to win both the WSOP Main Event and a WPT title.
Daniel Negreanu won WPT Player of the Year for Season 3 (III).

Season 4 (IV) 
The fourth season of the WPT featured 16 events running from May 2005 to April 2006.

 Gavin Smith won WPT Player of the Year for Season 4 (IV).

Season 5 (V) 
The fifth season of the WPT featured 18 events running from May 2006 to April 2007.

 J.C. Tran won WPT Player of the Year for Season 5 (V).

Season 6 (VI) 
The sixth season of the WPT featured 19 events running from April 2007 to April 2008.

 Gus Hansen became the first player to reach heads-up play four times.
 Jonathan Little won WPT Player of the Year for Season 6 (VI).

Season 7 (VII) 
The seventh season of the WPT featured 14 events running from May 2008 to April 2009.

 Bertrand Grospellier won WPT Player of the Year for Season 7 (VII).

Season 8 (VIII) 
The eighth season of the WPT featured 17 events running from May 2009 to April 2010.

 Season 8 featured six events held outside North America.
 Carlos Mortensen joined Gus Hansen as the only three-time WPT title winners.
 Faraz Jaka won WPT Player of the Year for Season 8 (VIII).
 Faraz Jaka was the first WPT Player of the Year to not win a WPT title during the season.

Season 9 (IX) 
The ninth season of the WPT featured 21 events running from May 2010 to May 2011.

 Season 9 featured eight events held outside North America.
Andy Frankenberger won WPT Player of the Year for Season 9 (IX).

Season 10 (X) 
The 10th season of the WPT featured 22 events running May 2011 to May 2012.

 Season 10 featured 11 events held outside North America.
Joe Serock won WPT Player of the Year for Season 10 (X).
Joe Serock was the second WPT Player of the Year to not win a WPT title during the season.

Season 11 (XI) 
The 11th season of the WPT featured 24 events running from August 2012 to May 2013.

 Marvin Rettenmaier was the first player to win back-to-back WPT titles.
Matt Salsberg won WPT Player of the Year for Season 11 (XI).

Season 12 (XII) 
The 12th season of the WPT featured 21 events running from August 2013 to April 2014.

 Season 12 saw the WPT World Championship relocate to the Borgata Hotel & Casino after the Bellagio hosted the event for the first 11 seasons of the WPT.
Mukul Pahuja won WPT Player of the Year for Season 12 (XII).
Mukul Pahuja was the third WPT Player of the Year to not win a WPT title during the season.

Season 13 (XIII) 
The 13th season of the WPT featured 18 events running from August 2014 to April 2015.

 Legends of Poker featured a $10,000 buy-in on Day 2.
Darren Elias became the first player to win back-to-back WPT titles in the same season.
Anthony Zinno won back-to-back WPT titles later in the season.
Anthony Zinno joined Gus Hansen and Carlos Mortensen as the only three-time WPT title winners.
Anthony Zinno won WPT Player of the Year for Season 13 (XIII).

Season 14 (XIV) 
The 14th season of the WPT featured 21 events running from May 2015 to April 2016.

 The WPT World Championship became the WPT Tournament of Champions where only past WPT champions were allowed to enter.
Season XIV winners received free entry into the WPT Tournament of Champions for that year.
David "Chino" Rheem joined Gus Hansen, Carlos Mortensen, and Anthony Zinno as the only three-time WPT title winners
Mike Shariati won WPT Player of the Year for Season 14 (XIV).

Season 15 (XV) 
The 15th season of the WPT featured 21 events running from April 2016 to April 2017.

 Only past WPT champions were allowed to enter the WPT Tournament of Champions.
Season XV winners received free entry into the WPT Tournament of Champions for that year.
Ema Zajmovic was the first female to win an open WPT event.
Benjamin Zamani won WPT Player of the Year for Season 15 (XV).
Benjamin Zamani was the fourth WPT Player of the Year to not win a WPT title during the season

Season 16 (XVI) 
The 16th season of the WPT featured 20 events running from April 2017 to May 2018.

 The WPT Tournament of Champions relocated from Seminole Hard Rock Hotel & Casino to ARIA Resort & Casino.
Only past WPT champions were allowed to enter the WPT Tournament of Champions.
Season XVI winners received free entry into the WPT Tournament of Champions for that year.
Darren Elias became the first player to win four WPT titles.
Art Papazyan won WPT Player of the Year for Season 16 (XVI).

Season 17 (XVII) 
The 17th season of the WPT featured 20 events running from July 2018 to June 2019.

 Five final tables played out at the HyperX Esports Arena at Luxor Las Vegas. They included the L.A. Poker Classic (March 11), Gardens Poker Championship (March 12), Borgata Winter Poker Open (March 13), Seminole Hard Rock Poker Showdown (May 30), and WPT Choctaw (May 31).
Only past WPT champions were allowed to enter the WPT Tournament of Champions.
Season XVII winners received free entry into the WPT Tournament of Champions for that year.
Erkut Yilmaz won WPT Player of the Year for Season 17 (XVII)

Season 18 (XVIII) 
The 18th season of the WPT would begin in July 2019 and be extended through 2021 as a result of the COVID-19 pandemic.

 Brian Altman became the first player to win the same event twice winning WPT Lucky Hearts Poker Open in Season 13 (XIII) and Season 18 (XVIII).
 The Gardens Poker Championship, Borgata Winter Poker Open, and L.A. Poker Classic each reached a final table that was to be played out at HyperX Esports Arena at Luxor Las Vegas, but due to the COVID-19 pandemic, they were indefinitely delayed.
In March 2020, the WPT announced their first-ever online series to be held on partypoker.
The Gardens Poker Championship concluded from the PokerGO Studio on March 10, 2021.
Brian Altman won WPT Player of the Year for Season 18 (XVIII).

Season 19 (XIX) 
The 19th season of the WPT would begin in May 2021.

 Brian Altman became the seventh player to win three WPT titles when he won the inaugural WPT Seminole Hard Rock Tampa.
 WPT bestbet Scramble and WPT Maryland at Live! Casino were cancelled due to COVID-19 concerns.
 Season 19 (XIX) would end following the conclusion of the WPT Five Diamond World Poker Classic and reset to a calendar basis for Season 20 (XX).
 Jacob Ferro won WPT Player of the Year for Season 19 (XIX).

Season 20 (XX) 
The 20th season of the WPT began in January 2022.

 Season 20 (XX) would introduce a new points system that would include all WPT-sponsored events.
 The WPT World Championship returned for the first time since Season 13 (XIII) at the new location of Wynn Las Vegas.
 The WPT World Championship would also feature the biggest prize pool guarantee in WPT history at $15,000,000.
 For the first time since Season 1 (I), the WPT Five Diamond World Poker Classic wasn't held in December as it was moved to October.
 Chad Eveslage won WPT Player of the Year for Season 20 (XX).

Multiple World Poker Tour champions 
Darren Elias holds the record for most WPT titles with four after he broke a five-way tie with Carlos Mortensen, David "Chino" Rheem, Gus Hansen, and Anthony Zinno after winning the Season 16 (XVI) WPT Bobby Baldwin Classic for $387,580.

 WPT Alpha 8. WPT Special Events, WPT500, and WPTDeepStacks titles are not included in table for WPT Main Tour titles.
WPT World Championship titles count, but WPT Tournament of Champions titles don't count as they are not open events.

References

World Poker Tour winners